Nicolás Martínez Vargas (born 19 March 1991) is an Argentine footballer who plays as a forward for Liga Nacional club Cobán Imperial.

Career
All Boys were Martínez's first senior team. He appeared on the Argentine Primera División club's bench for a match with Boca Juniors in June 2012, prior to making his professional debut in October against San Martín. He spent the 2013–14 season out on loan with Fénix in Primera B Metropolitana. He participated in twenty-six fixtures for Fénix, scoring five goals in the process which included a brace versus both Deportivo Armenio and Deportivo Morón. Martínez returned to a relegated All Boys for 2014, before leaving in July 2015 to join Colegiales. He was sent off in his first start against Flandria. Martínez left in 2017 after forty-eight appearances.

In July 2017, Martínez completed a move to Chilean football by signing for Barnechea of Primera B. He didn't feature for their first-team due to injury issues, though was on the bench on two occasions. A year after moving to Chile, Martínez returned to his homeland to play for Primera C Metropolitana side Leandro N. Alem.

Career statistics
.

Honours
Cobán Imperial 
Liga Nacional de Guatemala: Apertura 2022

References

External links

1991 births
Living people
Footballers from Buenos Aires
Argentine footballers
Association football forwards
Argentine expatriate footballers
Argentine Primera División players
Primera Nacional players
Primera B Metropolitana players
All Boys footballers
Club Atlético Fénix players
Club Atlético Colegiales (Argentina) players
A.C. Barnechea footballers
Club Leandro N. Alem players
Deportivo Sanarate F.C. players
Antigua GFC players
Expatriate footballers in Chile
Expatriate footballers in Guatemala
Argentine expatriate sportspeople in Chile
Argentine expatriate sportspeople in Guatemala